Fidelia may refer to:

Fidelia (given name)
Fidelia (pseudonym), common in the 18th century
Fidelia (bee), a genus of insects in family Megachilidae
Scorzoneroides (formerly Fidelia), a plant genus in the dandelion tribe

See also
Fidelio (disambiguation)
Fidel (disambiguation)